Air Mauritanie Flight 625 was a Fokker F28 Fellowship 4000 which crashed on landing at Tidjikja Airport, Mauritania on 1 July 1994 in sandstorm conditions. All four crew and 76 of the 89 passengers were killed in the crash. It remains the deadliest crash involving a Fokker 28 and the deadliest one in Mauritania.

Aircraft 
The aircraft involved was a Fokker F28-4000 Fellowship (serial number 11092) that had its maiden flight on 3 July 1975. The aircraft was powered by two RB183-555-15H turbofan engines. At the time, the -6000 variant was considered new. On 30 July 1976 the aircraft was delivered to Linjeflyg with registration PH-SIX. In April 1978, it was converted into the -4000 variant, and was transferred to NLM CityHopper on 17 April. On 27 April 1979, the aircraft was leased to Libyan Arab Airlines (the registration remained the same). On 26 February 1980 the plane was leased to Pars Air, and the registration was changed to EP-PBG. On 26 November 1981, the aircraft was returned to Linjeflyg, and was once again re-registered as PH-six. On December 15, 1983, The aircraft was sold to Air Mauritanie, on 15 December 1983, and the registration was changed to 5T-CLF.

Accident 
The plane aircraft operated Flight MR625 (other information states the flight number as - MR251) from Nouakchott to Tidjikja. On board were 89 passengers and 4 crew members. The landing was performed in a sandstorm. The F28 had made several approaches to the airport before making a heavy landing, which caused the front undercarriage to collapse and the aircraft to slide off the runway, crash into a rocky outcrop and burst into flames. Only 13 passengers survived while all four crew members and the remaining 76 passengers died.

References 

Airliner accidents and incidents caused by weather
Accidents and incidents involving the Fokker F28
Aviation accidents and incidents in 1994
1994 in Mauritania
July 1994 events in Africa
Pages with unreviewed translations